Steve or Steven Hoffman may refer to:
Steve Hoffman (audio engineer), audio and mastering engineer. 
Steve Hoffman (American football), American football player and coach
Steven Hoffman (Australian footballer), former Australian rules footballer
Steven Hoffman (South African footballer), South African football goalkeeper

See also

Steve Hoffmann, American physician
Steve Huffman, CEO of Reddit